This is the list of 2014 Malaysia Super League goalscorers.

Goals

11 goals

 Paulo Rangel (Selangor)

10 goals

 Luciano Figueroa (Johor Darul Takzim)

7 goals

 Khairul Amri (LionsXII)
 Matías Conti (Pahang)

 6 goals

 Juan Arostegui (ATM)
 Dickson Nwakaeme (Pahang)
 S. Chanturu (Sarawak)

4 goals

 Francis Doe (Kelantan)
 Mohamed Shawky (Kelantan)
 Mohammed Ghaddar (Kelantan)
 Safuwan Baharudin (LionsXII)
 Patrick Wleh (PKNS)
 Ryan Griffiths (Sarawak)
 Zairo Anuar (Terengganu)

3 goals

 Bruno Martelotto (ATM)
 Badhri Radzi (Kelantan)
 Sufian Anuar (LionsXII)
 Zulfahmi Arifin (LionsXII)
 Damion Stewart (Pahang)
 Marco Tulio (Perak)
 Aminuddin Noor (PKNS)
 Milorad Janjuš (Sarawak)
 Rasyid Aya (Sarawak)
 Dilshod Sharofetdinov (Sime Darby)
 Fazrul Hazli (Sime Darby)
 Mateo Roskam (Sime Darby)
 Syukur Saidin (Sime Darby)
 Patrich Wanggai (T-Team)
 Nor Farhan Muhammad (Terengganu)

2 goals

 Christie Jayaseelan (ATM)
 Fabrice Noël (ATM)
 Amri Yahyah (Johor Darul Takzim)
 Jorge Pereyra Díaz (Johor Darul Takzim)
 Pablo Aimar (Johor Darul Takzim)
 Safee Sali (Johor Darul Takzim)
 Fakri Saarani (Kelantan)
 Khairul Izuan (Kelantan)
 Faris Ramli (LionsXII)
 Azamuddin Akil (Pahang)
 Faizol Hussien (Pahang)
 Fauzi Roslan (Pahang)
 Hafiz Kamal (Pahang)
 R. Gopinathan (Pahang)
 Abdulafees Abdulsalam (Perak)
 Eliel da Cruz Guardiano (Perak)
 Norhakim Isa (Perak)
 Fauzan Dzulkifli (PKNS)
 Shahrul Azhar (PKNS)
 Gábor Gyepes (Sarawak)
 Joseph Kalang Tie (Sarawak)
 Andik Vermansyah (Selangor)
 Thamil Arasu (Selangor)
 Fadzli Saari (Sime Darby)
 Fahrul Razi (Sime Darby)
 Mahmoud Amnah (Sime Darby)
 Nazrul Kamaruzaman (Sime Darby)
 Marzuki Yusof (T-Team)
 Ashaari Shamsuddin (Terengganu)
 Ismail Faruqi (Terengganu)
 Javier Estupiñán (Terengganu)
 Mamadou Barry (Terengganu)
 Manaf Mamat (Terengganu)
 Mario Karlovic (Terengganu)

1 goals

 Affize Faisal (ATM)
 Amirizwan Taj (ATM)
 Marlon James (ATM)
 Norfazly Alias (ATM)
 Rezal Zambery (ATM)
 Riduwan Ma'on (ATM)
 Yusaini Hafiz (ATM)
 S. Thinagaran (ATM)
 Baihakki Khaizan (Johor Darul Takzim)
 Fadhli Shas (Johor Darul Takzim)
 Fazly Mazlan (Johor Darul Takzim)
 Hariss Harun (Johor Darul Takzim)
 Mahali Jasuli (Johor Darul Takzim)
 Nazrin Nawi (Johor Darul Takzim)
 Norshahrul Idlan Talaha (Johor Darul Takzim)
 Safiq Rahim (Johor Darul Takzim)
 Wan Zaharulnizam (Kelantan)
 Afiq Yunos (LionsXII)
 Hafiz Abu Sujad (LionsXII)
 Nazrul Nazari (LionsXII)
 Shakir Hamzah (LionsXII)
 R. Surendran (Pahang)
 Saiful Nizam (Pahang)
 Zesh Rehman (Pahang)
 J. Partiban (Perak)
 Khairul Asyraf (Perak)
 Milan Purović (Perak)
 R. Mugenthirran (Perak)
 Sukri Hamid (Perak)
 Hamka Hamzah (PKNS)
 Helmi Remeli (PKNS)
 Karlo Primorac (PKNS)
 Khairu Azrin (PKNS)
 Nazmi Faiz (PKNS)
 P. Gunalan (PKNS)
 Junior Eldstål (Sarawak)
 Muamer Salibašić (Sarawak)
 Afiq Azmi (Selangor)
 Fitri Shazwan (Selangor)
 Steve Pantelidis (Selangor)
 Arif Ismail (Sime Darby)
 Failee Ghazli (Sime Darby)
 Farid Ramli (Sime Darby)
 William Mensah (Sime Darby)
 Azlan Ismail (T-Team)
 Badrul Hisyam (T-Team)
 Evaldo Goncalves (T-Team)
 Jimmy Mulisa (T-Team)
 Khairan Ezuan (T-Team)
 Leandro Dos Santos (T-Team)
 Nelson San Martin (T-Team)
 Nizad Ayub (T-Team)
 Ramzul Zahini (T-Team)
 Azlan Zainal (Terengganu)
 Faiz Subri (Terengganu)
 Márcio Da Silva (Terengganu)
 Moustapha Dabo (Terengganu)
 Vincent Bikana (Terengganu)

Own Goals

1 goals
 Ronny Harun (Sarawak) (for Pahang)
 Helmi Remeli (PKNS) (for Selangor)
 Aminuddin Noor (PKNS) (for Johor Darul Takzim)
 Junior Eldstål (Sarawak) (for Terengganu)
 Norfazly Alias (ATM) (for Sarawak)

See also
 Super League Malaysia seasons
 2014 Malaysia Super League
 Malaysia Super League

References

External links
 Official website

2014 in Malaysian football
2014 goalscorers

ms:Liga Super Malaysia 2014